Villa Malta may refer to:

 Villa Malta (Pincio hill), headquarters of La Civiltà Cattolica in Rome, Italy
 Villa del Priorato di Malta on the Aventine Hill in Rome, Italy
 Villa Malta (Cologne), Germany
 Villa Pagana in Rapallo, Italy